John Frewer (1 November 1883 – 7 December 1974) was an Anglican bishop in Australia.

Frewer was born in Fulletby, Lincolnshire. He was educated at The King's School, Canterbury and Lincoln Theological College. He was ordained in 1909 and, after being a curate in Boston, Lincolnshire, he emigrated to Australia where he became domestic chaplain to the Bishop of Bunbury - eventually becoming a canon of the diocese. A member of the Brotherhood of St Boniface, he was their warden from 1919 until his ordination to the episcopate. He served as second Bishop of North West Australia from 1929 to 1965.

References

1883 births
People educated at The King's School, Canterbury
Anglican bishops of North West Australia
1974 deaths
English emigrants to Australia
People from East Lindsey District
Alumni of Lincoln Theological College